Carl Frederick Selmer Jr. (June 13, 1925 – November 2020) was an American football player and coach. He was the head coach of the University of Miami football program from 1975 to 1976. Before becoming head coach, he was the offensive coordinator for Miami, and before that, he was the offensive line coach for Nebraska Cornhuskers, helping the Huskers to national championships in 1970 and 1971. While a Cornhusker assistant coach, he was tasked with recruiting in Minnesota.

Head coaching record

College

References

1925 births
2020 deaths
BC Lions coaches
Miami Hurricanes football coaches
Nebraska Cornhuskers football coaches
North Texas Mean Green football coaches
Notre Dame Fighting Irish football coaches
Kansas State Wildcats football coaches
Wyoming Cowboys football coaches
Wyoming Cowboys football players
High school football coaches in Wyoming
Sports coaches from Minneapolis
Players of American football from Minneapolis